The 2019 Portland State Vikings football team represented Portland State University during the 2019 NCAA Division I FCS football season. They were led by fifth-year head coach Bruce Barnum and played their home games at Hillsboro Stadium. They were a member of the Big Sky Conference. They finished the season 5–7, 3–5 in Big Sky play to finish in a three-way tie for sixth place.

Previous season
The Vikings finished the 2018 season 4–7, 3–5 in Big Sky play to finish in a tie for ninth place.

Preseason

Big Sky preseason poll
The Big Sky released their preseason media and coaches' polls on July 15, 2019. The Vikings were picked to finish in tenth place in both polls.

Preseason All–Big Sky team
The Vikings had two players selected to the preseason all-Big Sky team.

Offense

Charlie Taumopeau – TE

Defense

Kenton Bartlett – DT

Schedule

Source:

Game summaries

at Arkansas

Simon Fraser

at Boise State

Eastern Oregon

at Idaho State

Southern Utah

Idaho

at Northern Colorado

at Northern Arizona

Montana

UC Davis

at Eastern Washington–The Dam Cup

References

Portland State
Portland State Vikings football seasons
Portland State Vikings football
Portland State Vikings football
Sports in Hillsboro, Oregon